Polje is a small village southwest of Šentviška Gora in the Municipality of Tolmin in the Littoral region of Slovenia.

References

External links

Polje on Geopedia

Populated places in the Municipality of Tolmin